Kondoraphe kiyokoae is a species of tropical land snail with gills and an operculum, terrestrial gastropod mollusk in the family Neocyclotidae. This species is endemic to Micronesia.

References

Fauna of Micronesia
Neocyclotidae
Taxonomy articles created by Polbot